The Natchaug River is a  river in Windham and Tolland Counties in northeastern Connecticut. The name Natchaug comes from the Nipmuc language and is believed to mean land between rivers.

Course
The Natchaug River is formed in Eastford, Connecticut at the confluence of Bigelow Brook and the Still River. It then flows to the south, paralleling Connecticut Route 198. The river also runs along (and in a few cases through) the western border of the main Natchaug State Forest parcel. Where the river briefly passes through Natchaug State Forest, locals can have picnics along the river, go fishing, and enjoy white-water rafting through the abundant rapids and swimming in the river's clean water. This spot becomes very crowded during the summer. After passing through this area, the Natchaug River begins flowing in a more southwesterly direction, still paralleling Connecticut Route 198. The river now enters the town of Chaplin. Diana's Pool, another popular swimming hole for locals, lies on the Natchaug River just before this point. The river then continues to flow to the southwest, entering Windham, and paralleling U.S. Route 6. It finally flows into the Mansfield Hollow Lake near the Windham Airport. The Natchaug River then flows out of the Mansfield Hollow Reservoir through the Mansfield Hollow Dam, now carrying the waters of the Mount Hope River and the Fenton River, which also flow into the Mansfield Hollow Reservoir. After leaving the reservoir, the Natchaug River forms the border between the towns of Mansfield and Windham, and also the border between Windham County and Tolland County. It then flows in and out of the Willimantic Reservoir, which is used for drinking water purposes and not for recreational use, then enters Willimantic. it joins the Willimantic River, forming the Shetucket River.

Large boulders and rapids can be found along much of the river. A small oxbow forms just south of the Reservoir, nearby US 6, causing the boundary of Windham and Mansfield to depart from the river briefly.

Crossings

Whitewater Rafting
The Natchaug River is popular with rafters for its swift waters and challenging rapids.  The river has a particularly challenging stretch in Chaplin.  This stretch is less than a mile but is quite intense, ranking at Class IV on the International Scale of River Difficulty, and with a number of waterfall-like drops.

Fishing
The Natchaug River is popular with fishermen from the area.  The river is stocked with trout by the Connecticut Department of Environmental Protection, but several other types of fish also swim in its waters.

See also
List of rivers of Connecticut
Natchaug School
Natchaug Trail

References

External links
rafting on the river

Rivers of Tolland County, Connecticut
Willimantic, Connecticut
Rivers of Windham County, Connecticut
Rivers of Connecticut
Connecticut placenames of Native American origin
Tributaries of the Thames River (Connecticut)